David van der Kellen Jr. (1804 in Amsterdam – 1879 in Utrecht), was a 19th-century engraver and medallist from the Northern Netherlands.

Biography
According to the RKD he was a pupil of his father David van der Kellen Sr., Hendrik van Oort, and Bruno van Straaten.  He was a student of the Utrecht artist society 'Kunstliefde' and the city academy there. He made medals for special occasions as well as official coins and became the mint master for the city of Utrecht after his father died in 1825. He was the father of Johan Philip van der Kellen, who succeeded him at the Utrecht mint, and David III, who became a painter and museum director.

References

portrait of David van der Kellen on website of Utrecht archives
David van der Kellen II on website of the Museum De Lakenhal in Leiden

1804 births
1879 deaths
Dutch engravers
Dutch medallists
Artists from Utrecht
19th-century sculptors